Albert Hertel (19 April 1843, Berlin - 12 February 1912, Berlin) was a German landscape painter.

Life and work 
He began his studies at the Berlin University of the Arts. At the age of twenty, he went to Rome and stayed there for almost four years. In addition to studying the masters, he became interested in landscape painting and took lessons from Heinrich Dreber.

In 1867, he returned to Berlin. He was only there for a year, however, then went to study at the Kunstakademie Düsseldorf with Oswald Achenbach, a well known landscape painter. In 1875, he was appointed a lecturer at the Berliner Kunstakademie, and placed in charge of the landscape painting studio. After two years there, he began working as a free-lance artist.

In addition to his landscapes, which he usually painted "en plein air", he created still-lifes and some genre pieces. He also did a few illustrations; for some tragedies by Sophocles, small dioramas of Bad Gastein, and a cycle of six Italian scenes.

In 1897, he was awarded a small gold medal at the Große Berliner Kunstausstellung. In 1902, he presented draft designs for thirteen paintings in tempera, to adorn the Imperial Staircase at Berlin Cathedral. There were nine square murals depicting the life of Jesus, and four oval ceiling panels on Biblical parables. They were approved by Kaiser Wilhelm II, and completed shortly before the Cathedral's opening in 1905.

He died at the age of sixty-eight. His grave at the  has not been preserved.

References

Further reading 
 Ines Hertel: Der Berliner Maler Albert Hertel. (1843–1912). Ein Beitrag zur Kunstgeschichte des 19. Jahrhunderts. Esprint, Heidelberg 1981, 
 Prussian Academy of Art: Memorial Exhibition for Albert Hertel, Otto Lessing, Paul Wallot (catalog), Berlin 1913
 "Hertel, Albert". In: Friedrich von Boetticher: Malerwerke des neunzehnten Jahrhunderts. Beitrag zur Kunstgeschichte. Vol.I, Dresden 1895, pg.511.

External links 

 More works by Hertel @ ArtNet

1843 births
1912 deaths
19th-century German painters
19th-century German male artists
German landscape painters
Berlin University of the Arts alumni
Artists from Berlin
20th-century German painters
20th-century German male artists